One-Upmanship is an album by American jazz pianist Mal Waldron with soprano saxophonist Steve Lacy, recorded in 1977, and released by the Enja label. The CD reissue added three solo piano pieces to the original album.

Reception
The Allmusic review awarded the album 4 stars.

Track listing
All compositions by Mal Waldron
 "One-Upmanship" — 11:05 
 "Duquility" — 8:31  Bonus track on CD reissue 
 "The Seagulls of Kristiansund" — 11:20 
 "Thoughtful" — 6:07  Bonus track on CD reissue 
 "Hooray for Herbie" — 19:39 
 "Soul Eyes" — 6:49  Bonus track on CD reissue 
Recorded at Conny's Studio in Wolperath, West Germany on February 12, 1977 (tracks 1, 3 & 5) and at Tonstudio Bauer in Ludwigsburg, West Germany on May 8, 1978 (tracks 2, 4 & 6).

Personnel
 Mal Waldron — piano 
 Manfred Schoof  — cornet (tracks 1, 3 & 5)
 Steve Lacy — soprano saxophone (tracks 1, 3 & 5)    
 Jimmy Woode — bass (tracks 1, 3 & 5) 
 Makaya Ntshoko — drums (tracks 1, 3 & 5)

References

Enja Records albums
Mal Waldron albums
Steve Lacy (saxophonist) albums
1977 albums